The Loveday Trials is the third in the Loveday series of books written by Kate Tremayne.

Plot summary

Adam, now married to the half-gypsy Senara, returns to his home to find his father threatening to disown him for his wife's heritage. To support his wife and new child, he becomes an undercover agent helping nobility to escape from a France now in the turmoil of revolution.

Meanwhile, his brother St John is making a fortune as a smuggler and his wife Meriel is pregnant with his second child, ensuring his future as heir to their father's estate. But his success has made him an enemy of Thadeous Lanyon, a rival smuggler. When Lanyon attacks Meriel and causes her to lose her child, he is soon found murdered. With all the evidence pointing to him, St John faces execution unless the family can find some way of proving his innocence.

2001 British novels
Novels by Kate Tremayne
Novels set in Cornwall
Historical romance novels
Novels set in the French Revolution
British romance novels